Khersin (also Romanized as Khersīn) is a village in Siyahu Rural District, Fin District, Bandar Abbas County, Hormozgan Province, Iran. At the 2006 census, its population was 442, in 121 families.

References 

Populated places in Bandar Abbas County